The Mexican Catholic Apostolic Church ( (ICAM)) is an Independent Catholic denomination founded in 1925, by separating from the Catholic Church. It was created to bolster revolution with the support of the Regional Confederation of Mexican Workers (CROM) and Mexican President Plutarco Elías Calles' approval. Its development was marked by several internal crises, followed by consequent splits and mergers. Since 1993, it has been officially listed in the Mexican Federal Registry of Religious Associations.

Name

History
President Álvaro Obregón and his successor Calles, as well as other politicians, wanted the revolutionary government to restrict and terminate the Catholic Church in Mexico. In February 1925, armed intruders calling themselves the "Knights of the Order of Guadalupe" occupied the church of María de la Soledad in Mexico City where , a Freemason and former Catholic priest, proclaimed himself the future patriarch of a new national church; Parishioners attacked the interlopers and rioted the next day; similar riots were incited when other churches in Mexico were occupied by armed intruders that month. These armed intruders occupying churches induced a fear of anti-Catholic persecution that led to the formation of the National League for the Defense of Religious Liberty (LNDLR) a militant Catholic defense organization.

Official favoritism of a national church enraged revolutionaries who saw this as a "violation of state " with potential to cause division in the revolution, so Calles stopped his support of  after about 3 months. Nevertheless, the government failed in 1925 to orchestrate Pérez's consecration by a visiting Eastern Orthodox bishop, but in 1926, North American Old Roman Catholic Church Bishop Carmel Henry Carfora consecrated Pérez, Antonio Benicio López Sierra, and Macario López Valdez as bishops. Pérez moved his cathedral to San Antonio in March 1930 but in April 1931, Pérez returned to Mexico City.

Beliefs
The  supports clerical marriage, rituals in the vernacular, the sacrament of Communion under both kinds, individual Biblical interpretation, veneration of saints and Mary the mother of Jesus, but opposed the Roman Catholic dogma of papal infallibility, denied eternal damnation, rejected the sacrament of Penance, and had an "experimental commitment to liturgical innovation."

Expansion technique
The government confiscated and nationalized all Catholic Church assets in 1859 and, prior to the 1992 legislation of an amendment to the 1917 Constitution of Mexico, religious institutions were not permitted to own property in Mexico; "the Catholic Church was prevented from conducting any legal transactions in Mexico." Other legal anticlerical restrictions included mandatory civil registration of clergy. When the Calles Law took effect in July 1926, the Catholic Church suspended all public worship and within days the Cristero rebellion began.

Butler described it as Mexican Gallicanism. With the understanding that the law provided for the formation of local committees to govern the use of church buildings, local authorities gathered residents in a public place to facilitate the devolution of church buildings, according to Ramirez, and  priests
These local committees voted on the devolution of church buildings and on many occasions, after such votes, riots erupted that ended with casualties. This activity provoked the hostility of Catholics and two  priests were killed.

Calles' successor, Emilio Portes Gil, did not support .

In June 1929, Dwight Morrow, United States Ambassador to Mexico, mediated a modus vivendi between the Mexican episcopate and the Mexican federal government. Portes Gil signed the modus vivendi and soon the Catholic Church resumed public worship in many church buildings throughout Mexico.
The federal modus vivendi and the devolution of church buildings to Catholic Church use disconcerted some state and local authorities.

It is uncertain how long  subsisted, according to Ramirez, about 60 priests were  ministers, and between 1925 and 1937, about 70 church buildings, generally in small villages, were returned to  use, but most of those buildings were soon closed. Ramirez notes that  subsisted through the Cristero rebellion, spread to the southern United States, and survived the end of the Calles government.

Pérez was unable to maintain discipline among the clergy.

 dwindled in Mexico and San Antonio by 1930. Instead of spreading , according to Ramirez, Pérez's subordinates coveted his position of patriarch and devised ecclesial intrigues.

After Pérez
Pérez died in 1931, days after his public recantation and reconciliation with the Catholic Church.

While Pérez permitted clerical marriage, Dávila rescinded Pérez's approval and required clerical celibacy.

Dávila has his cathedral in the village of San Pedro.

Dávila petitioned Eastern Orthodox patriarchs in the 1930s to recognize him.

The Mexican Apostolic National Church was a Western Rite Orthodox Church in Mexico whose creation was inspired by the relationship between the Soviet Union and the Russian Orthodox Church.

After Pérez died, the individual parishes continued to exist essentially independently,

The entire diocese of this national church was subsumed into the created Orthodox Church in America Exarchate of Mexico in 1972.

Opinion

Notes

References

External links
 Iglesia Católica Apostólica Mexicana: Documentos

Further reading
 
 

Independent Catholic denominations
Catholicism in Mexico
Christian organizations established in 1925
1925 establishments in Mexico